The Song You Heard When You Fell in Love was an LP album issued by Atlantic Records in 1958, featuring vocalist Betty Johnson. It was recorded in New York City. Except for the title song, all the numbers on the album were old standards, many dating back to the 1930s.
Two versions of the album were released, a monophonic version (catalog number LP 8027) and a stereophonic version (catalog number SD 8027).

Track listing

Betty Johnson albums
1959 albums
Atlantic Records albums